Holger Hansen (1929–2015) was a Danish politician, academic and jurist from Venstre who served as the minister of environment and minister of Greenland in the cabinet of Poul Hartling from 1973 to 1975. Trained as an agronomist, he received a law degree and worked as an academic after retiring from politics.

Early life and education
Hansen was born in Tågeby near Mern on 16 May 1929. He graduated from a high school in Frederiksborg and went to England to study agriculture in 1952. He attended Lyngby agricultural school in the period 1952–1953.

In 1977 Hansen started his studies in law at the University of Copenhagen and graduated in 1980 earning a bachelor's degree. In 1985 he received a master's degree in law.

Career
In 1954, Hansen started in politics when he became the head of Venstres Ungdom (VU), Venstre party's youth organization, in Præstø county. From 1957 to 1959 he was a member of its national executive committee. Between 1958 and 1973 he worked at several municipal councils. He was elected to the Danish Parliament in 1960 for the first time and served there until 1977 for Venstre. On 19 December 1973, Hansen was appointed both minister of environment and minister for Greenland to the cabinet led by Prime Minister Poul Hartling. Hansen's tenure ended on 13 February 1975 when the cabinet resigned following the 1975 election.

From 1986 Hansen worked at University of Copenhagen as a faculty member of the Faculty of Law which he headed between 1994 and 1996.

Personal life and death
Hansen married Anna Sofie Hansen on 9 September 1961. They had three children. He died in Tågeby on 3 May 2015 and buried there on 8 May.

References

20th-century Danish landowners
21st-century Danish landowners
1929 births
2015 deaths
Danish agronomists
Danish Ministers for the Environment
Members of the Folketing 1968–1971
Members of the Folketing 1971–1973
Members of the Folketing 1973–1975
Members of the Folketing 1975–1977
People from Vordingborg Municipality
Academic staff of the University of Copenhagen
University of Copenhagen alumni